Percy Mckay May (6 October 1927 – 16 October 1977) was a British gymnast. He competed in eight events at the 1948 Summer Olympics. May was a member of the Swansea YMCA gymnastics club, which won the British men's championship teams competition seven times between 1947 and 1954.

References

1927 births
1977 deaths
British male artistic gymnasts
Olympic gymnasts of Great Britain
Gymnasts at the 1948 Summer Olympics
Sportspeople from Swansea